"Anorak"  is a British slang term which refers to a person who has a very strong interest, perhaps obsessive, in niche subjects. This interest may be unacknowledged or not understood by the general public. The term is sometimes used synonymously with "geek" or "nerd", or the Japanese term "otaku", albeit referring to different niches.

Etymology
The first use of the term to describe an obsessive fan has been credited to the radio presenter Andy Archer, who used the term in the early 1970s for fans of offshore radio, who would charter boats to come out to sea to visit the radio ships.
     
In 1983, the first edition of the Anoraks UK Weekly Report was published, featuring news of pirate radio broadcasts.
In 1984 the Observer newspaper used the term as a metonym for the prototype group interested in detailed trivia, the trainspotters, as members of this group often wore unfashionable but warm cagoules or parkas called "anoraks" when standing for hours on station platforms or along railway tracks, noting down details of passing trains.

References

External links

English-language slang
Epithets related to nerd culture
Transport culture
Fandom
History of subcultures
1980s neologisms